Miss Global Zimbabwe is a National Beauty Pageant in Zimbabwe that was founded in 2012 by Tare Munzara and Ronald Tisauke, that promotes beauty, charity and tourism. The Pageant sends its winner to Miss Globe International   and Miss Global International. Its 1st runner up goes to Miss International Pageant.

History
The first officially Miss Global Zimbabwe in 2012 was Mutsa Mutare who represented Zimbabwe at the Miss Global International 2012 in Jamaica. Before her there were many Zimbabwean models who participated to Miss Global International in which the first Miss Global International title winner in 2006 was Ropa Garise and the second to win the international pageant in 2007 was Miss Zimbabwe 2007, Cynthia Muvirimi. The current title holder for Miss Global Zimbabwe 2013-2014 is Nyasha Mutsauri. . Nyasha Mutsauri  recently was the host for the international pageant Miss Heritage 2013 Pageant which was staged in Harare Zimbabwe. She also has done a lot of charity work.

Titleholders
Color key

The winner of Miss Global Zimbabwe represents her country at Miss Global International. On occasion, when the winner does not qualify (due to age) for either contest, a runner-up is sent.

References

External links
Official page

Zimbabwe
Beauty pageants in Zimbabwe
Recurring events established in 2012
Zimbabwean awards
2012 establishments in Zimbabwe